Virginia's 1st Senate district is one of 40 districts in the Senate of Virginia. It has been represented by Democrat Monty Mason since his victory in a 2016 special election following the death of fellow Democrat John Miller.

Geography
District 1 is located in the Hampton Roads metropolitan area in southeastern Virginia, including all of Williamsburg and parts of Hampton, Newport News, Suffolk, James City County, and York County.

The district overlaps with Virginia's 1st, 2nd, and 3rd congressional districts, and with the 76th, 92nd, 93rd, 94th, 95th, and 96th districts of the Virginia House of Delegates.

Recent election results

2019

2016 special

2015

2011

Federal and statewide results in District 1

Historical results
All election results below took place prior to 2011 redistricting, and thus were under different district lines.

2007

2003

1999

1995

District officeholders since 1904

References

Virginia Senate districts
Hampton, Virginia
James City County, Virginia
Newport News, Virginia
Suffolk, Virginia
Williamsburg, Virginia
York County, Virginia